List of rivers in Mato Grosso (Brazilian State).

The list is arranged by drainage basin, with respective tributaries indented under each larger stream's name and ordered from downstream to upstream. Mato Grosso is divided by those streams that flow north to the Amazon and east to the Tocontins rivers and those that flow south to the Paraná river.  All rivers in Mato Grosso ultimately drain to the Atlantic Ocean.

By Drainage Basin

Amazon Basin 

 Amazon River (Pará, Amazonas)
 Xingu River
 Iriri River
 Iriri Novo River
 Ribeirão da Paz
 Liberdade River
 Auaiá-Miçu River
 Huaiá-Miçu River
 Arraias River
 Manissauá-Miçu River
 Azul River
 Suia-Miçu River
 Atelchu River
 Ronuro River
 Jabotá River
 Ferro River
 Tamitatoale River
 Ribeirão Auila
 Curisevo River
 Kevuaieli River
 Pacuneiro River
 Sete de Setembro River
 Culuene River
 Couto de Magalhães River
 Tapajós River (Pará)
 Teles Pires River
 Apiacá River
 Paranaíta River
 Cristalino River
 Peixoto de Azevedo River
 Parado River
 Verde River
 Juruena River
 São Tomé River
 São João da Barra River
 Arinos River
 Dos Peixes River
 São Venceslau River
 Parecis River
 Sumidouro Grande River
 Dos Patos River
 Vermelho River
 Do Sangue River
 Crauari River
 Membeca River
 Sacuriuiná River
 Juína-Mirim River
 Papagaio River
 Sauêruiná River
 Buriti River
 Sacre River
 Verde River
 Camararé River
 Camarazinho River
 Juína River
 Formiga River
 Juininha River
 Canumã River (Amazonas)
 Sucunduri River
 Madeira River (Amazonas)
 Aripuanã River
 Roosevelt River
 Flor do Prado River
 Madeirinha River
 Branco River
 Da Jacutinga River
 Capitão Cardoso River
 Tenente Marques River
 Guaribe River
 Branco River
 Guaporé River
 Branco River (Cabixi River)
 Guaritire River
 Verde River
 Galera River
 Sararé River
 Barbado River
 Alegre River

Tocantins/Araguaia Basin 

 Tocantins River (Pará)
 Araguaia River
 Ribeirão Crisóstomo
 Tapirapé River
 Xavante River
 Xavantinho River
 Rio das Mortes
 São João River
 Maracajá River (Baracaju River)
 Mirapuxi River
 Curuá River
 Ribeirão Pindaíba
 Noidoro River
 Cumbuco River
 Das Garças River
 Barreiro River
 Diamantino River

Paraná Basin 

 Paraná River (Argentina)
 Paraguay River
 Taquari River
 Cuiabá River
 Mutum River
 Piqueri River
 Itiquira River
 Correntes River
 São Lourenço River
 Poguba River (Vermelho River)
 Ponte de Pedra River
 Jorigue River
 Tadarimana River
 Coxipó River
 Manso River
 Roncador River
 Casca River
 Curiche Grande River (Corixa Grande River)
 Cassanje River
 Alegre River
 Bento Gomes River
 Paraguazinho River
 Sagradouro Grande River
 Jauru River
 Aguapeí River
 Cabaçal River
 Sepotuba River
 Juba River
 Jauquara River

Alphabetically 

 Aguapeí River
 Alegre River
 Alegre River
 Apiacá River
 Araguaia River
 Arinos River
 Aripuanã River
 Arraias River
 Atelchu River
 Auaiá-Miçu River
 Ribeirão Auila
 Azul River
 Barbado River
 Barreiro River
 Bento Gomes River
 Branco River
 Branco River
 Branco River (Cabixi River)
 Buriti River
 Cabaçal River
 Camararé River
 Camarazinho River
 Capitão Cardoso River
 Da Casca River
 Cassanje River
 Correntes River
 Couto de Magalhães River
 Coxipó River
 Crauari River
 Ribeirão Crisóstomo
 Cristalino River
 Cuiabá River
 Culuene River
 Cumbuco River
 Curiche Grande River (Corixa Grande River)
 Curisevo River
 Curuá River
 Diamantino River
 Ferro River
 Flor do Prado River
 Formiga River
 Galera River
 Das Garças River
 Guaporé River
 Guaribe River
 Guaritire River
 Huaiá-Miçu River
 Iriri River
 Iriri Novo River
 Itiquira River
 Jabotá River
 Da Jacutinga River
 Jauquara River
 Jauru River
 Jorigue River
 Juba River
 Juína River
 Juína-Miriam River
 Juininha River
 Juruena River
 Kevuaieli River
 Liberdade River
 Madeirinha River
 Manissauá-Miçu River
 Manso River
 Maracajá River (Baracaju River)
 Membeca River
 Mirapuxi River
 Rio das Mortes
 Mutum River
 Noidoro River
 Pacuneiro River
 Papagaio River
 Parado River
 Paraguay River
 Paraguazinho River
 Paranaíta River
 Parecis River
 Dos Patos River
 Ribeirão da Paz
 Dos Peixes River
 Peixoto de Azevedo River
 Ribeirão Pindaíba
 Piqueri River
 Poguba River (Vermelho River)
 Ponte de Pedra River
 Ronuro River
 Roosevelt River
 Sacre River
 Sacuriuiná River
 Do Sangue River
 São João River
 São João da Barra River
 São Lourenço River
 São Tomé River
 São Venceslau River
 Sararé River
 Sauêruiná River
 Sepotuba River
 Sete de Setembro River
 Sucunduri River
 Sagradouro Grande River
 Suia-Miçu River
 Sumidouro Grande River
 Tadarimana River
 Tamitatoale River
 Tapirapé River
 Taquari River
 Teles Pires River
 Tenente Marques River
 Verde River
 Verde River
 Verde River
 Vermelho River
 Xavante River
 Xavantinho River
 Xingu River

References
 Map from Ministry of Transport
 Rand McNally, The New International Atlas, 1993.
  GEOnet Names Server

 
Mato Grosso
Environment of Mato Grosso